Cascade Airways was an airline in the northwest United States which flew primarily regional air routes out of Seattle, Washington. Founded in 1969, it operated for 17 years and was shut down in 1986. Its IATA code (CZ) was later assigned to China Southern Airlines which was formed two years after Cascade's shutdown.

Operations
Headquartered in Spokane, Washington, Cascade Airways served the northwest U.S., primarily Seattle, Spokane, Salt Lake City, Portland, Pasco, Pullman, Boise, and Yakima.

Other points served included Wenatchee, WA, Moses Lake, WA, Walla Walla, WA (which was the location of Cascade's main maintenance base), Lewiston, ID, Idaho Falls, ID, Pocatello, ID, Kalispell, Missoula, Helena, and Butte in Montana, and Calgary, Alberta in Canada. Also served were Eugene, OR, Medford, OR; Reno, NV; Twin Falls, ID; Olympia, WA; and Richland, WA (via Pasco).

When Horizon Air began operating in 1981, Cascade was then competing against a better financed airline with Horizon Air eventually acquiring Air Oregon and Transwestern Airlines.  Cascade then sought help from Horizon in 1985, but Horizon subsequently backed out of the deal and Cascade was forced to cease operations in March 1986.

Cascade introduced British Aircraft Corporation BAC One-Eleven twinjet aircraft into its fleet in the fall of 1984.  The BAC One-Eleven was the only jetliner type it ever operated.  Cascade was also operating Hawker Siddeley HS 748, Beechcraft 1900C, and Fairchild Swearingen Metroliner (Metro III) turboprop aircraft at this time.

Destinations in 1984 and 1985

According to its system timetables dated October 15, 1984 and April 4, 1985, Cascade was serving the following destinations.  Those destinations appearing in bold typeface received BAC One-Eleven jet service.  Most of the destinations that received jet service were also served with turboprop aircraft by the airline.  Other destinations were served with turboprop aircraft only:

 Boise, ID (BOI) – Focus city
 Butte, MT (BTM)
 Calgary, AB Canada (YYC) – only international destination served by Cascade
 Eugene, OR (EUG)
 Helena, MT (HLN)
 Idaho Falls, ID (IDA)
 Kalispell, MT (FCA)
 Lewiston, ID/Clarkston, WA (LWS)
 Medford, OR (MFR)
 Moses Lake, WA (MWH)
 Olympia, WA (OLM)
 Pasco, WA (PSC)
 Pocatello, ID (PIH)
 Portland, OR (PDX) – Focus city
 Pullman, WA/Moscow, ID (PUW)
 Reno, NV (RNO)
 Seattle, WA (SEA) – Hub
 Spokane, WA (GEG) – Focus city and headquarters
 Walla Walla, WA (ALW) – location of the airline's jet and turboprop maintenance base
 Wenatchee, WA (EAT)
 Yakima, WA (YKM)

Prior to the above referenced time frame, Cascade previously served the following destinations with turboprop aircraft:  Astoria, OR (AST), Missoula, MT (MSO), Salt Lake City, UT (SLC) and Twin Falls, ID (TWF).

Fleet

Cascade Airways operated the following aircraft types over the years:

 BAC One-Eleven series 200 jet
 BAC One-Eleven series 400 jet 
 Beechcraft 1900C turboprop 
 Beechcraft C99 turboprop 
 Embraer EMB 110 Bandeirante turboprop 
 Fairchild Swearingen Metroliner (Metro III model) turboprop 
 Hawker Siddeley HS 748 turboprop – the 48-passenger HS 748 was the largest turboprop aircraft ever operated by Cascade.

Accidents and incidents
On January 20, 1981, Cascade Airways Flight 201, Beech 99 N390CA, operating Seattle-Yakima-Moses Lake-Spokane, crashed at 11:27 am PST in fog during its approach to Spokane International Airport. Of the nine aboard, seven were killed: five passengers and the cockpit crew, Captain David Weinberger and First Officer Paul Davis. Two passengers, Steven Tarnoff and James Eagle. survived the crash, explosion, and fire. At the time of the crash, Cascade operated twelve Beech 99s and three Embraer Bandeirantes to eighteen cities in the Pacific Northwest.

Cascade had previously acquired Richland-based Columbia Pacific Airlines in November 1978, following a fatal crash of a Columbia Pacific Beech 99. Flight 23 over-rotated and stalled on take-off from the Richland Airport on February 10, 1978, killing both pilots and all 15 passengers.

Two passengers and two crew were aboard, and all survived with minor injuries. The pilot, Lee M. Leslie of Spokane, walked from the crash site to a nearby service station to report it. Due to fog, the flight had stopped in Pasco rather than Walla Walla.

On June 20, 1969, less than two weeks after commencing flights, Cascade Airways Beech 99 N2550A, operating on a cargo flight with no passengers lost power on takeoff and crashed at Pasco Airport, killing both crew members. The pilot was company vice president Vaughn Gundlach, age 35, and the co-pilot was Doug Thomson, age 24.

See also 
 List of defunct airlines of the United States

References

External links

Cascade Airways – nostalgia site

Defunct airlines of the United States
Defunct regional airlines of the United States
Airlines established in 1969
Airlines disestablished in 1986
Defunct companies based in Spokane, Washington
Airlines based in Washington (state)